The Salt Works Ranch, at 3858 U.S. Route 285 in Park County, Colorado near Hartsel, Colorado, was founded in 1862.  The land is unusual for the presence of saline springs.  It was listed on the National Register of Historic Places in 2001.

The ranch includes the Colorado Salt Works, which is separately listed on the National Register, and is crossed by U.S. Highway 285 and by the 1879 railroad grade of the Denver South Park & Pacific.

The main ranch house was built in 1872;  it has elements of Second Empire style.

A number of homestead log cabins, some moved from elsewhere to serve as quarters for ranch hands, survive on the property.

The property has senior water rights used for hay meadows.  In the same family for 140 years, it has been designated a Colorado Centennial Ranch by the Colorado Historical Society.

References

Centennial ranches
Ranches in Colorado
Log buildings and structures in Colorado
National Register of Historic Places in Park County, Colorado
Buildings and structures completed in 1862